The following is a partial list of the "A" codes for Medical Subject Headings (MeSH), as defined by the United States National Library of Medicine (NLM).

This list continues the information at List of MeSH codes (A13). Codes following these are found at List of MeSH codes (A15). For other MeSH codes, see List of MeSH codes.

The source for this content is the set of 2006 MeSH Trees from the NLM.

– stomatognathic system

– cheek

– facial muscles

– jaw
  – alveolar process
  – tooth socket
  – dental arch
  – mandible
  – chin
  – mandibular condyle
  – maxilla
  – palate
  – palate, hard

– masticatory muscles
  – masseter muscle
  – pterygoid muscles
  – temporal muscle

– mouth
  – dentition
  – dentition, mixed
  – dentition, permanent
  – dentition, primary
  – diastema
  – periodontium
  – alveolar process
  – tooth socket
  – dental cementum
  – epithelial attachment
  – gingiva
  – periapical tissue
  – periodontal ligament
  – tooth
  – bicuspid
  – cuspid
  – incisor
  – molar
  – molar, third
  – tooth, deciduous
  – natal teeth
  – tooth, unerupted
  – tooth components
  – dental cementum
  – dental enamel
  – dental pellicle
  – dental pulp
  – dental pulp cavity
  – dentin
  – dentin, secondary
  – tooth cervix
  – tooth crown
  – tooth germ
  – dental papilla
  – dental sac
  – enamel organ
  – tooth root
  – tooth apex
  – lip
  – labial frenum
  – mouth floor
  – mouth mucosa
  – palate
  – palatal muscles
  – palate, hard
  – palate, soft
  – uvula
  – salivary glands
  – parotid gland
  – salivary ducts
  – salivary glands, minor
  – sublingual gland
  – submandibular gland
  – tongue
  – lingual frenum
  – taste buds

– pharynx
  – hypopharynx
  – nasopharynx
  – oropharynx
  – tonsil
  – pharyngeal muscles
  – esophageal sphincter, upper

– temporomandibular joint
  – temporomandibular joint disk

The list continues at List of MeSH codes (A15).

A14